James Arthur Dyer (24 August 1883 – 1971) was an English footballer. His regular position was as a forward.

Dyer was born in Blacker Hill in Barnsley. He played for Wombwell Town before moving to Barnsley, where he made two Football League appearances. After spells at Doncaster Rovers and Ashton Town, he moved to Manchester United but only made a single appearance.

The 1908–09 season saw a move to West Ham United of the Southern League. He made three appearances for the east London club during September 1909, before moving to Bradford Park Avenue, where he failed to make a League appearance.

References

External links
Profile at StretfordEnd.co.uk
Profile at MUFCInfo.com

1883 births
1971 deaths
Footballers from Barnsley
English footballers
Association football forwards
Wombwell Town F.C. (1890s) players
Barnsley F.C. players
Doncaster Rovers F.C. players
Ashton Town A.F.C. players
Manchester United F.C. players
West Ham United F.C. players
Bradford (Park Avenue) A.F.C. players
Mexborough F.C. players
Castleford Town F.C. players
Harrogate Town A.F.C. players
English Football League players
Southern Football League players